Aaron Mader (born July 21, 1982), better known by his stage name Lazerbeak, is an American record producer, singer, and guitarist from Minneapolis, Minnesota. He has been a member of Doomtree, The Plastic Constellations, Mixed Blood Majority, Shredders, and Night Stone.

Early life
Lazerbeak was born Aaron Mader on July 21, 1982. He graduated from Hopkins High School.

Career
Lazerbeak released a collaborative album with Mike Mictlan, titled Hand Over Fist, in 2008.

His first solo album, Legend Recognize Legend, was released in 2010.

He produced Sims' second solo album, Bad Time Zoo, as well as his Wildlife EP, both of which were released in 2011.

In 2012, he released a solo album, Lava Bangers. Another solo album, Luther, was released in 2019.

Discography

Studio albums
 Hand Over Fist (2008) 
 Death of a Handsome Bride (2009) 
 Legend Recognize Legend (2010)
 Lava Bangers (2012)
 Kill Switch (2012) 
 Parades (2018) 
 Luther (2019)
Penelope (2020)
Cameron (2021)

EPs
 Pool Boys (2017)

Singles
 "Winging It" (2019)
 "Retreat" (2019)
 "Ready" (2019)

Productions
 Mike Mictlan – "Euthanasia", "Marq'd 4 Death", "Soul Survivor", and "...The End" from False Hopes Eight: Deity for Hire (2005)
 Dessa – "Mineshaft" and "Press On" from False Hopes (2005)
 Sims – "15 Blocks", "So It Goes", "May 1st", and "Osmosis" from Lights Out Paris (2005)
 Mac Lethal – "Calm Down Baby" from 11:11 (2007)
 Playaz Lounge Crew – "The Struggle" and "That Guy (Plays On)" from Hype Hop (2007)
 Sims – "Pay No Mind", "TC AG", and "Birds and Earthworms" from False Hopes XIV (2009)
 P.O.S – "Let It Rattle", "Purexed", "Graves (We Wrote the Book)", "Goodbye", and "Been Afraid" from Never Better (2009)
 Dessa – "The Crow" and "Dutch" from A Badly Broken Code (2010)
 Sims – Bad Time Zoo (2011)
 Sims – Wildlife (2011)
 Astronautalis – "Thomas Jefferson" from This Is Our Science (2011)
 P.O.S – "Fuck Your Stuff", "They Can't Come", "Lock-picks, Knives, Bricks and Bats", and "Fire in the Hole/Arrow to the Action" from We Don't Even Live Here (2012)
 Lizzo – Lizzobangers (2013)
 Dessa – "Skeleton Key" and "Fighting Fish" from Parts of Speech (2013)
 Johnny Questionmark – "Whiskey" from Falling in Like (2014)
 F. Stokes – "Caps" and "Gots to Save You" from Liquor Sto' Diaries (2014)
 Sims – "OneHundred", "Oakland Ave Catalpas", "Badlands", "Buckets", and "Skating in My Sheets" from More Than Ever (2016)
 P.O.S – "Wearing a Bear" and "Roddy Piper" from Chill, Dummy (2017)

References

External links
 Lazerbeak at Doomtree
 

1982 births
Living people
Musicians from Minneapolis
Businesspeople from Minneapolis
Record producers from Minnesota
American hip hop record producers
Doomtree members
Hopkins High School alumni